Phillip Taylor House, also known as the Pennsylvania Memorial Home, is a historic home located at Brookville, Jefferson County, Pennsylvania. It was built about 1841, and is a two-story, brick dwelling with a rear two-story addition and flanking wood-frame ell in the Italian Villa-style. The main building has a hipped roof and belvedere. The front facade is 5-bays wide and features an elaborately ornamented open porch.  It was acquired for use as a soldier's convalescent home in 1889, and was used for that purpose into the 1970s.

It was added to the National Register of Historic Places in 1982.

References

Houses on the National Register of Historic Places in Pennsylvania
Italianate architecture in Pennsylvania
Houses completed in 1841
Houses in Jefferson County, Pennsylvania
National Register of Historic Places in Jefferson County, Pennsylvania